

André Pierre Bourque Jr. (October 7, 1958 – August 28, 2021) was a race car driver, developer, journalist, broadcaster and former politician in Ottawa, Ontario, and operated the online news aggregator site Bourque Newswatch (Newswatch). 

Bourque was born at the Ottawa General Hospital in 1958, the son of Pierre Bourque (Sr.) and Barbara McNeil. He was the grandson of E. A. Bourque, Ottawa's first francophone mayor.

Politics
Following a ten-year career as a race car driver, and a brief apprenticeship with his father's land development business, Bourque was appointed to Ottawa City Council and the Regional Municipality of Ottawa-Carleton in March 1991 to fill a vacancy after Marc Laviolette became mayor. Bourque was appointed following a council vote, defeating 17 other candidates, including community activists Maurice Pagé and Richard Cannings. Bourque was supported by the "pro-developer" bloc on council, and was opposed by the council's left wing, who coalesced behind Pagé. Bourque's stay on council was short lived, however, and he was defeated by Cannings in the municipal election that November. While on council, he opposed "all big projects", including bringing in a Triple-A baseball team and improving Lansdowne Park. He also opposed all tax increases, and called for the demolition of some heritage buildings in his ward such as the Daly Building. He had near-perfect attendance in both committee and council meetings.

Two years later, he ran for Parliament in the 1993 Canadian election as a Liberal candidate in the Montreal riding of Rosemont, and lost to Bloc Québécois candidate Benoît Tremblay. 

Bourque ran for Ottawa city council again in 1994, in the new Bruyère-Strathcona Ward but was defeated by Stéphane Émard-Chabot. At this point in his career, he was vice president of his father's company, Bourque, Pierre & Fils. He ran on a platform of safety, improving street lighting and basic services, and called for the removal of traffic barriers in the Byward Market. He also wanted to "control taxes by cutting frivolous expenditures". Despite his campaign of fiscal restraint, Bourque was embroiled in a scandal during the campaign as he owed $1.1 million to creditors, after his father promised to repay some of his debts, but went to other debts instead.

Journalism
In 2001, the Ryerson Review of Journalism (RRJ) criticized Bourque and Newswatch. RRJ said Bourque had not written some of his books but only acted as a researcher. In addition, many of Newswatch's breaking stories had often been inaccurate. RRJ also reported that, despite Bourque's web traffic claims, a random sample indicated that Canadian Internet users had not visited the Newswatch site and that no major Canadian journalist used Newswatch as a source.

Newswatch has also been criticized for allowing advertisers to purchase headlines and to "torque" them to highlight a positive news story about itself or a negative story about an opponent.

Bourque was a fill-in host and contributor to radio talk shows on 580 CFRA.

Racing driver
Bourque was race car driver in the NASCAR Busch East Series and NASCAR Canadian Tire Series, competing from 2007 to 2011.

Motorsports career results

NASCAR
(key) (Bold – Pole position awarded by qualifying time. Italics – Pole position earned by points standings or practice time. * – Most laps led.)

Nationwide Series

Camping World Truck Series

Rolex Sports Car Series

Grand Touring
(key) Bold – Pole Position. (Overall Finish/Class Finish).

Personal life
Bourque was married to Kristine Haselsteiner and had two children.

Death
Bourque died of a heart attack in 2021.

References

External links
 Personal site
 
 Bourque Newswatch

1958 births
2021 deaths
Ottawa city councillors
Candidates in the 1993 Canadian federal election
Journalists from Ontario
Canadian sportsperson-politicians
Racing drivers from Ontario
Sportspeople from Ottawa
NASCAR drivers
ARCA Menards Series drivers
Franco-Ontarian people
Liberal Party of Canada candidates for the Canadian House of Commons
Real estate and property developers
Canadian talk radio hosts